The 2017 Myanmar by-elections were held on 1 April 2017. The elections were held to fill 19 vacant parliamentary seats: nine in the Pyithu Hluttaw, three in the Amyotha Hluttaw, and seven in regional parliaments of Kayah State Hluttaw and Shan State Hluttaw. The seats were left by those who became government leaders or officials after the 2015 general election, or unable to be held due to instability at that time.

Results

House of Nationalities

House of Representatives

State and Regional Hluttaws

Results By Constituency

References

Myanmar
By-elections
By-elections in Myanmar
Myanmar